This is a list of broadcast television stations that are licensed in the U.S. state of Washington.

Full-power stations
VC refers to the station's PSIP virtual channel. RF refers to the station's physical RF channel.

Defunct full-power stations
Channel 9: KCWK - Ind./The CW - Walla Walla (2001 – 2008-05-30)
Channel 16: KBAS-TV - Ephrata (1957-02-15 – 1961-11-30)
Channel 22: KNBS - Walla Walla (1960-01-03 – 1960-12-14)
Channel 27: KCWT - Wenatchee (1984 – 1993)
Channel 31: KTRX - Kennewick/Pasco (1958-10-28 – 1958-11-05)
Channel 56: KPEC-TV - NET/PBS - Tacoma/Lakewood Center (1960-04-02 – 1975)

LPTV stations

Defunct LPTV stations
Channel 27: KCWK-LP - CW (2001-2008) - Yakima

Translators

Washington

Television stations